Savinskaya is a rural locality (a village) in Vozhegodskoye Urban Settlement, Vozhegodsky District, Vologda Oblast, Russia. The population was 153 as of 2002.

Geography 
The distance to Vozhega is 8 km. Pelevikha, Okulovskaya-1, Gridinskaya, Davydikha are the nearest rural localities.

References 

Rural localities in Vozhegodsky District